The Federal Building and Post Office, also known as the Old Post Office or Fallon Post Office is located at 90 N. Maine St. in Fallon, Nevada. It was built around 1928-29 and is a Classical Revival-style building of a standard design.  It was listed on the National Register of Historic Places in 2006.

References 

National Register of Historic Places in Churchill County, Nevada
Neoclassical architecture in Nevada
Government buildings completed in 1929
Federal buildings in the United States
Government buildings on the National Register of Historic Places in Nevada